The Kazimierz Ostrowski Award is one of the most important awards given to Polish artists and designers in recognition of their excellence. Founded in 2002, it is financed by the NDI construction group and presented annually by the Association of Polish Painters and Designers in Gdańsk. The official ceremony of the award is held in Gdańsk and is accompanied by an exhibition of the laureate's work. 

The award was named after the Polish painter Kazimierz Ostrowski (1917-1999).

Recipients
Source: NDI
2016: Janusz Lewandowski
2015: Lech Majewski 
2014: Stanisław Białogłowicz 
2013: Jarosław Modzelewski 
2012: Stanisław Fijałkowski 
2011: Zbigniew Makowski 
2010: Stanisław Rodziński 
2009: Tadeusz Dominik 
2008: Aldona Mickiewicz 
2007: Janina Kraupe 
2006: Władysław Jackiewicz 
2005: Maciej Świeszewski 
2004: Stefan Gierowski 
2003: Jacek Sempoliński 
2002: Kiejstut Bereźnicki 
2001: Teresa Pągowska

See also
List of European art awards
Prizes named after people

External links
 - The Association of Polish Painters and Designers in Gdańsk

Visual arts awards
Awards established in 2002
Polish awards
2002 establishments in Poland